Running Creek is a rural locality in the Scenic Rim Region, Queensland, Australia. It borders New South Wales.

Geography 
The locality is bounded to the south by the ridgeline of the McPherson Range (which defines the Queensland border with New South Wales). The watercourse Running Creek (from which the locality takes its name) rises in Lamington on the northern slopes of the McPherson Range and enters the locality from the south-west (Mount Gipps) and then flows north through the locality exiting to the north-west (Rathdowney), where it immediately becomes a tributary of the Logan River.

Running Creek has the following mountains:

 Grass Tree Knob 
 Lawn Hill 
 Mount Chinghee 

Running Creek has the following mountain passes:

 Gradys Gap Gate
 Richmond Gap

There are a number of neighbourhoods in Running Creek:

 Dulbolla
 Glenapp
 Waiweer

Mount Chinghee and Mount Chinghee National Park are located in the south east of Running Creek.  The national park has no walking tracks or visitor facilities. It aims to protect remnant rainforest and preserve habitat.

The Sydney–Brisbane rail corridor traverses the length of the north south axis of Running Creek.  At the border the railway enters a tunnel and then traverses the Cougal Spiral.

Nearby the Lions Road passes through Richmond Gap on the McPherson Range and links to Cougal in northern New South Wales.

The terrain is generally hilly with elevations rising in the south to well above 600 metres along the McPherson Range.  It covers the area roughly equivalent to the catchment formed by Running Creek, with the exception of its most upper parts which lie in Mount Gipps and Southern Lamington.  Running Creek, itself a tributary of the Logan River, has a number of tributaries including New Year Creek and Camp Creek.  Vegetation has been cleared in many parts for primary production purposes.

History 

Timber was an important early industry in the area. There were sawmills at Running Creek and Glenapp. These sawmills no longer exist.

Glenapp Provisional School opened on 19 August 1901. On 1 January 1909 it became Glenapp State School. It closed on 9 December 1960. It was located on the eastern side of Running Creek Road south of the junction with Spring Creek Road.

The Beaudesert Shire Tramway operated between Beaudesert to Rathdowney and Lamington from 1903 to 1944. It had a stop in Running Creek called Dulbolla station.

The Glenapp railway signal box is located on the eastern side of the Brisbane-to-Sydney railway line at Running Creek. The hut was established in 1930 and is only one of a few remaining intact in the country. Having been made redundant due to automation, it was proposed to demolish the Glenapp signal box in 2007. However, the "Glenapp boys" Den and Rob Sibson, who had grown up in the Glenapp community, decided to rescue and restore the signal box as a small museum. The Glenapp railway siding was relocated to the Rathdowney Historical Museum.

Telemon Environment Park which later became known as Mount Chinghee National Park was first gazetted in 1994.

Education 
There are no schools in Running Creek. The nearest primary school is Rathdowney State School in neighbouring Rathdowney to the north-west. The nearest secondary school is Beaudesert State High School in Beaudesert.

See also
 List of tramways in Queensland

References

Further reading

External links 

Scenic Rim Region
Localities in Queensland